Mohamad Hassan Commander (born October 1938) is a politician belonging to Kargil Ladakh in Jammu and Kashmir state of India. He is affiliated with the Indian National Congress and is a senior member of its district unit.

In 1989 he was elected as an independent to Lok Sabha from the Ladakh constituency.

References

Living people
1938 births
Indian National Congress politicians
Lok Sabha members from Jammu and Kashmir
India MPs 1989–1991